Louise Viktoria Tolstoy (born 29 July 1974) is a Swedish jazz singer of Russian ancestry. She is the great-great-granddaughter of Russian writer Leo Tolstoy and the daughter of Erik Kjellberg. Tolstoy was a regular studio guest in season one of the television series Big Brother in 2000.

She was married to designer Per Holknekt from 2001 until they divorced in March 2008.

Discography

As leader
 Smile, Love and Spice (Sittel, 1994)
 Viktoria Tolstoy (EMI, 1996)
 For Alskad (EMI, 1996)
 White Russian (Blue Note, 1997)
 Blame It On My Youth (EMI, 2001)
 Shining On You (ACT, 2004)
 My Swedish Heart (ACT, 2005)
 Pictures of Me (ACT, 2006)
 My Russian Soul (ACT, 2008)
 Letters to Herbie (ACT, 2011)
 A Moment of Now (ACT, 2013)
 Meet Me at the Movies (ACT, 2017)
 Stations (ACT, 2020)

As guest
With Nils Landgren
 2002 – Sentimental Journey
 2004 –  Funky ABBA

With others
 1998 − Här kommer natten, Svante Thuresson
 2007 – Christmas with My Friends (ACT)
 2012 – Super Music, UMO Jazz Orchestra (Blue Note)
 2016 – Green Man, Beat Funktion
 2016 – Jazz at Berlin Philharmonic V (ACT)

See also
 List of Swedes in music

References

External links 

 Official website

B.H. Hopper Management - Artist Management

1974 births
Living people
People from Sigtuna Municipality
ACT Music artists
Swedish people of Russian descent
Viktoria
Swedish soul singers
20th-century Swedish women singers
21st-century Swedish women singers